Shenandoah is an American country music band founded in 1984 by Marty Raybon, Ralph Ezell, Stan Thorn, Jim Seales and Mike McGuire. Its discography comprises eleven studio albums, a greatest hits package, a Christmas music album, and eight compilations. Two of Shenandoah's studio albums — The Road Not Taken (1989) and Extra Mile (1990) — have been certified gold by the Recording Industry Association of America (RIAA). The band's 1994 Super Hits compilation, part of a series issued by Sony BMG Special Markets, has been certified gold as well.

Shenandoah has also released 31 singles to country radio. Of these singles, five have reached Number One on the Billboard country charts: "The Church on Cumberland Road", "Sunday in the South" and "Two Dozen Roses" (all 1989), "Next to You, Next to Me" (1990), and "If Bubba Can Dance (I Can Too)" (1994). Ten more singles have reached Top Ten on that chart, including the late 1994-early 1995 "Somewhere in the Vicinity of the Heart", a collaboration with Alison Krauss, which was also her first Top 40 country hit.

Studio albums

Compilation albums

Extended plays

Singles

Music videos

References

Country music discographies
Discographies of American artists